Peerless Sports Club (formerly known as Peerless FC), or simply Peerless, is an Indian professional football club based in Kolkata, West Bengal. Founded in 1993, the club is owned by Peerless Group and currently competes in the Calcutta Premier Division A, the top tier state football league of West Bengal. Peerless is widely regarded as "Giant killer" in Kolkata football.

The club has refused to take part in the I-League 2nd Division owing to financial matters. After the three Kolkata giants Mohun Bagan AC, SC East Bengal and Mohammedan Sporting, Peerless is considered as the strongest side from the city of joy.

History
Peerless as a club began their journey from Kolkata Maidan, the home of Kolkata football. The club is founded in 1993 and owned by its parent organization Peerless Group, a business conglomerate in Kolkata.

Earlier in the 90s, the club competed in the Calcutta Premier League second division. Former India international Shabbir Ali was in charge of the club and under his coaching, Peerless promoted itself from the first division to the CFL Super Division in 1993–94 season.

In 2018, the club signed Trinidad and Tobago international Anthony Wolfe ahead of their CFL season. Thus he became the club's first and only footballer who has appeared in the FIFA World Cup. In 2019, Peerless created history after winning the 2019–20 Calcutta Premier Division, defeating their archrivals; three Kolkata giants. The club managed by Jahar Das, emerged as the first small club since 1958 to win the Calcutta Football League. In that season, they reached the quarter-finals of the 2020 IFA Shield.

As defending champion, Peerless began their 2021–22 Calcutta Premier Division journey on 17 August, defeating Kidderpore FC 4–1. They reached the knock-out stages after finishing as Group-B topper but lost 4–0 to Railway FC in the quarter-finals. In June 2022, the club roped in Soren Dutta as head coach and Iranian former footballer Jamshid Nassiri as technical director. In July, they participated in Naihati Gold Cup and their campaign ended with a 0–0 (5–4) defeat to United SC in semi-finals. In September, the club fought in group stages of the Calcutta Premier Division but failed to reach the "super six" round.

Ownership and finances
Peerless Sports Club (formed in 1993) is currently owned by Peerless Group, its major holding company is Peerless General Finance & Investment Co Ltd, which is India's Registered Residuary non-banking Company. It has subsidiaries like Peerless Hospital, Bengal Peerless (real estate), Kaizen Holidays and others.

Patit Paban Ray, a board member of Bengal Peerless Housing Development Co Ltd, is currently the chairman of Peerless Club.

Stadium

Peerless plays most of their home matches of Calcutta Football League Premier Division A at both the Barasat Stadium and Rabindra Sarobar Stadium.

Honours

League
Calcutta Premier Division A
Champions (1): 2019–20
Runners-up (1): 2018–19
Third place (1): 1996–97

CFL Second Division
Champions (1): 1993

Cup

Trades Cup
Winners (1): 2006

All Airlines Gold Cup
Runners-up (1): 1998

Peerless SC scripted history as they became the only club outside the "Big Three" (Mohun Bagan AC, East Bengal FC, & Mohammedan Sporting) to win the Championship in 61 years. Eastern Railway did the same back in 1958.

Notable players
For all current and former notable Peerless SC players with a Wikipedia article, see: Peerless SC players.

World Cup player
 Anthony Wolfe (2018, 2019–2020, 2021–present)

Managerial history

See also
 Calcutta Football League
 Football in Kolkata
 List of football clubs in Kolkata
 List of football clubs in India

References

Further reading

External links
 Peerless SC at IFA West Bengal
Peerless SC at Soccerway
Peerless SC at Flashscore
Peerless SC at Betsapi

Football clubs in Kolkata
Sports clubs in India
Association football clubs established in 1993
1993 establishments in West Bengal
Works association football clubs in India